Remmy Kimutai Limo (born 25 August 1971) is a retired Kenyan athlete who specialized in the triple jump.

International competitions

Personal bests
Long jump -  (1998)
Triple jump -  (1998)

References

External links

1971 births
Living people
Kenyan male triple jumpers
Olympic athletes of Kenya
Athletes (track and field) at the 1996 Summer Olympics
Commonwealth Games medallists in athletics
Athletes (track and field) at the 1998 Commonwealth Games
World Athletics Championships athletes for Kenya
Commonwealth Games bronze medallists for Kenya
African Games silver medalists for Kenya
African Games medalists in athletics (track and field)
Athletes (track and field) at the 1999 All-Africa Games
Medallists at the 1998 Commonwealth Games